The M3 is a motorway in England, from Sunbury-on-Thames, Surrey, to Eastleigh, Hampshire; a distance of approximately . The route includes the Aldershot Urban Area, Basingstoke, Winchester, and Southampton.

It was constructed as a dual three-lane motorway except for its two-lane section between junction 8 (A303) and junction 9. The motorway was opened in phases, ranging from Lightwater/Bagshot to Popham in 1971 to Winchester to Otterbourne Hill in 1995. The latter stages attracted opposition from environmental campaigns across Britain due to its large cutting through wooded Twyford Down; numerous road protests were held which delayed its opening. Similar protests were avoided on the near-parallel A3 by the construction of the Hindhead Tunnel. Since completion, the motorway has been an artery to the west and midsections of the South Coast and Isle of Wight including for tourism. The major settlements nearest to the motorway are served by a railway also used for commuting but are relatively dispersed. Traffic on the M3 sees delays and congestion on its busiest sections near commuting hotspots and during holiday periods. From Chertsey to Fleet the road was in 2017 converted to a Smart Motorway, turning the hard shoulder into a permanent fourth lane with emergency refuge lay-bys.

History

The motorway was originally approved as the "London to Basingstoke Motorway" with delays over funding for an extension to Southampton the road was built to relieve two single carriageway trunk roads that were congested.

In 1967, sections of the A33 from Popham, Hampshire, to a northeastern point of the Winchester Bypass were widened to dual carriageways; this only partially alleviated growing congestion, especially in Winchester, which led to the southern phase gaining approval.

Eastern section
The eastern section, from Sunbury-on-Thames in Surrey to Popham near Basingstoke opened in sections: first the Hampshire section in 1971, and then the Surrey section in 1974. The cost for this first phase was £46m. The completed road acts were as a continuation of the A316 Country Way, an express three-lane road from Apex Corner, Hanworth, in Greater London to Sunbury-on-Thames.

The section is one of five routes into the southern half of London which reach Inner London with at least a dual-carriageway - or dual-direction - road, the others being the A3 (M), the A30/A4, the M20 and A2. However approximately one mile before reaching Inner London it combines with the routes of the A30 and M4 approaches.

Southern section
A first public inquiry for the "M3 London to Basingstoke Motorway: Popham to Compton extension" centred on the section passing Winchester, and was held in 1971, after which the ministry was instructed to reconsider and reconsult on the proposals. A second public inquiry was held in 1976–77. The earlier decision to route the motorway through or alongside the water meadows between St Catherine's Hill and the compact cathedral city was reopened, and during the year-long inquiry the headmaster of Winchester College was forcibly ejected along with others for causing a disturbance.

The scope of the M3 extension was reduced to defer the difficult decision about the section around Winchester and it was built in two sections (from 'Popham to Bridget's Farm' and from 'Bridget's Farm to Bar End') in 1995. When this opened, the temporary junction to the A33 parallel route was removed.

The section of the M3 from near Junction 12 (Eastleigh and Chandler's Ford) to the last, Junction 14 for the M27 replaced part of the A33, which was upgraded to motorway standard and opened in 1991.

In 2008, the busiest section of the motorway, at Chandler's Ford, carried a daily average of around 130,000 vehicles.

The southern section starts as a continuation of a single-lane avenue, Bassett Avenue and The Avenue in the City of Southampton as the M27 provides alternative routes from other parts of the city, particularly its waterfront and downtown peak-hour accessway, the M271 motorway and Mountbatten Way providing dual to three lane highways starting at the northwest of the city.

Abandoned/suspended proposals
A service station was envisaged at Basingstoke upon the motorway's completion but not built – superseded by one just north of Fleet and another north of Winchester.
Plans for a Basingstoke Services were again published in November 2017

Additions
An additional junction, numbered 4A, was opened in April 1992 for Fleet.

Detailed route
The M3 starts at Sunbury-on-Thames in Surrey on the edge of South West London as the continuation of the A316 which has three lanes each way from Hanworth in the London Borough of Hounslow, and two from Chiswick. The motorway  after its start turns more west-southwest, crosses the River Thames on the M3 Chertsey Bridge to the north of Chertsey and then has its second junction, at the M25 motorway, before continuing through the gorse, bogs and heather of the Surrey Heath.  Its third junction is for Camberley, Bagshot, Bracknell, Ascot and Worplesdon.  From Junction 4 it bisects the northern Blackwater Valley conurbation then has its latest junction for Fleet and nearby early 21st century expanded/new villages, it crosses the South West Main Line, before skirting Old Basing and Basingstoke to its north. Turning south west again, it passes Popham and, just before reaching Junction 8, where one lane becomes the A303 which leads to Exeter and South West England. From here the motorway continues as a dual two lane road through open countryside and Micheldever Wood until it reaches the north of Winchester.

Taking over the  "Winchester Bypass" the M3 resumes to three lanes each way at Junction 9, continues directly south and then takes a small curve around the east of the city running through a deep cutting in Twyford Down and then proceeding south west again, crossing the South West Main Line a second time alongside the River Itchen and through the Eastleigh urban-suburban area before crossing the Eastleigh to Romsey railway line and ending at the Chilworth Roundabout on the edge of Southampton.

Road features
The Spitfire Bridge carries the B3404 Alresford Road from Winchester over the M3 motorway and the parallel A272 (J9-J10 spur, known as the "Spitfire Link"). It replaced a concrete parabolic arch bridge under which a Curtiss P-40 had been flown by George Rogers in October 1941. It was generally assumed locally that the aircraft had been a Spitfire, hence the name.

A private exit of the northern roundabout connected to Junction 4a provides access to the former UK headquarters of Sun Microsystems. As of 2018, this is now a new housing estate, Helios Park
The section of the M3 between J2 and J4a has been converted into a smart motorway, with full opening on 30 June 2017.

Incidents
In the early morning of 25 April 1999, the drum and bass DJ and record producer Valerie Olukemi "Kemi" Olusanya, known as Kemistry, was killed on the M3 near Winchester by the steel body of a cat's eye, which had been dislodged by a van and flew through the windscreen of the following car in which she was a passenger. The coroner recorded a verdict of accidental death. A question was asked in the House of Lords about the safety of cat's eyes in light of the highly unusual incident, and the Highways Agency conducted an investigation into the "long-term integrity and performance" of various types of road stud.
On 1 April 2000, a zebra crossing was illegally painted across the northbound carriageway of the M3 between Junctions 4 and 4a.
On 23 September 2017, two firebombs were thrown from a bridge onto the motorway between junctions 9 and 11 by 17-year-old Nicholas Elger (who suffered from a psychiactric illness) leading to an 11-hour closure costing the economy an estimated £40million. The attacker was identified after being linked to a bottle of Voss water used to transport the fuel. Elger told police he wished he had killed somebody and entered guilty pleas to two counts of arson recklessly endangering life.

Junctions

Data from driver location signs are used to provide distance and carriageway identification information.

{| style="margin-left:1em; margin-bottom:1em; color:black; font-size:95%;" class="wikitable"
|-  style="background:#0080d0; text-align:center; color:white; font-size:120%;"
| colspan="5" | M3 motorway junctions
|-
!scope=col|miles
!scope=col|km
!scope=col abbr="Northeastbound"|North-east bound exits (B carriageway)
!scope=col|Junction
!scope=col abbr="Southwestbound"|South-west bound exits (A carriageway)
|- align="center"
| 15.0||24.2
| Road continues as A316 to London
| rowspan="2"|J1
| Sunbury, Kingston A308Non-motorway traffic
|- style="text-align:center;"
| 15.3||24.6
| Sunbury, Kingston A308
| Start of motorway
|- style="text-align:center;"
| 21.3||34.2
| Gatwick Heathrow – M25 (M23), (M4)
| J2
| Gatwick, Heathrow (M23, M4) M25
|- style="text-align:center;"
| 28.1||45.2
| Woking, Bracknell, Camberley, Bagshot, Lightwater A322
| J3
| Woking, Camberley, Bracknell, Bagshot, Lightwater A322
|- style="text-align:center;"
| 32.6||52.5
| Guildford, Farnham, Camberley, Farnborough, Aldershot A331
| J4
| Guildford, Farnham, Camberley, Farnborough, Aldershot A331
|- style="text-align:center;"
|
|
| style=background:skyblue | Entering Surrey
|
| style=background:skyblue | Entering Hampshire
|- style="text-align:center;"
| 34.4||55.4
| Fleet (A3013), Farnborough (West) A327
| J4a
| Fleet (A3013), Farnborough (West) A327
|- style="text-align:center;"
|
|
|Fleet services (Welcome Break) 
|Services
|Fleet services (Welcome Break)
|- style="text-align:center;"
| 41.9||67.4
| Hook A287 B3349
| J5
| Hook A287 B3349
|- style="text-align:center;"
| 46.6||75.0
| Basingstoke, Reading (A33), Alton A339
| J6
| Basingstoke, Newbury, Reading, Alton A339
|- style="text-align:center;"
| 51.8||83.3
| Basingstoke A30
| J7
| Basingstoke A30
|- style="text-align:center;"
| 53.1||85.5
|  No access
| J8
| The South West, Andover, Salisbury, Exeter A303
|- style="text-align:center;"
| 59.9||96.4
|Winchester services (Moto) 
|Services
|Winchester services (Moto) 
|- style="text-align:center;"
| 63.9||102.8
| The Midlands, Newbury A34 trunk road  Winchester A272, Alresford A31
| J9
| The Midlands, Newbury A34 trunk road  Winchester A272
|- style="text-align:center;"
| 65.2||105.0
| Winchester (City) B3330Alton, Alresford A31
| J10
|  No access
|- style="text-align:center;"
| 67.2||108.1
| Winchester A3090 Twyford B3335
| J11
| Winchester A3090Twyford B3335
|- style="text-align:center;"
| 70.0||112.6
| Eastleigh (North) A335
| J12
| Eastleigh (North), Chandler's Ford A335
|- style="text-align:center;"
| 71.8||115.6
| Eastleigh, Chandler's Ford A335
| J13
| Bournemouth M27(W) Eastleigh A335
|- style="text-align:center;"
|
|
| Start of motorway
| J14
| Southampton , Portsmouth M27(E)The West, Southampton Docks, Southampton A33
|-
|colspan=5|Notes
Distances in kilometres and carriageway identifiers are obtained from driver location signs/location marker posts. Where a junction spans several hundred metres and the data is available, both the start and finish values for the junction are shown. 
|-

See also
 List of motorways in the United Kingdom

Notes and references
Notes 

References

External links

Chris's British Road Directory
Motorway Database – M3
'Bad Junctions' – M3/A31 (Winchester)
The Motorway Archive – M3

Motorways in England
Transport in Surrey
Transport in Hampshire
Roads in Surrey